Clifford Rainey (born 1948, Whitehead, County Antrim, Northern Ireland) is a Northern Irish glass sculptor. he began his career as a linen damask designer and worked in William Ewarts linen manufacturers from 1965 to 1968. He later studied at Hornsey College of Art, the North East London Polytechnic School of Sculpture, where he specialised in glass sculpture, and the Royal College of Art from where he received an MA. Between 1973 and 1975 he ran his own glass studio in London. In 1975 he won a commission for a small sculpture to commemorate the Silver Jubilee of Elizabeth II and in 1976 was commissioned by Sun Life Assurance to make a large glass sculpture in Bristol. He was a lecturer at the Royal College of Art from 1977 until 1984. Rainey is the Chair of the Glass Program at the California College of the Arts in Oakland, California, where he has taught since 1991.

Public art
He has realized a number of large-scale public art commissions, including at Liverpool Lime Street railway station, England, The Jeddah Monument, Saudi Arabia, and The 911 Communication Center, San Francisco.

Exhibitions
His work has exhibited extensively, with exhibitions in New York, Dublin, London, Dallas, Vienna, Tokyo and Germany. His work is featured in numerous public collections, including the Victoria and Albert Museum in London, the Corning Museum of Glass in Corning, New York, the M. H. de Young Memorial Museum in San Francisco, and the Los Angeles County Museum of Art, as well as in the permanent collections of the Museum of Arts & Design, New York, Museum of Fine Arts, Boston, the Irish Museum of Modern Art, Dublin, and the Montreal Museum of Fine Arts.

Awards
Rainey is a recipient of the 2000 Virginia A. Groot Foundation Award and the 2009 Urban Glass Outstanding Achievement Award, New York.

Works
Head (1986), Pencil and pastel on paper, Arts Council of Northern Ireland collection
Palm Springs, Copper, brass and glass box on marble plinth, Arts Council of Northern Ireland collection
Shy Boy (2005), Museum of Fine Arts, Boston

References

1948 births
Living people
People from Whitehead, County Antrim
Artists from Northern Ireland
Sculptors from Northern Ireland
British glass artists